Corn nuts, also known as toasted corn, are a snack food made of roasted or deep-fried corn kernels. It is referred to as cancha in Peru and chulpi in Ecuador.

Preparation 
Corn nuts are prepared by soaking whole corn kernels in water for three days, then deep-frying them in oil until they are hard and brittle.
The kernels are soaked because they shrink during the harvesting and cleaning process, and rehydration returns them to their original size.

History 
Albert Holloway of Oakland, California introduced corn nuts to the United States in 1936. He originally sold them to tavern owners to be given away free to their patrons as a snack that would be great with beer, calling them Olin's Brown Jug Toasted Corn.

Varieties and brands

CornNuts 
Holloway later renamed his product CornNuts. After Holloway and his sons Maurice and Rich learned of a breed of corn grown in Cusco, Peru (often referred to as Cuzco corn) that grew large kernels (some said to have been bigger than a quarter), the company researched developing a hybrid of the Cusco corn that could be grown effectively in California. After a decade of research, the company introduced CornNuts made with the hybrid variety in 1964. CornNuts sold on the market today are no longer of the large Cusco corn size.

The most popular brand, CornNuts was owned by Holloway's original family company until the company was purchased by Nabisco in 1998. Cornnuts was a registered trademark of Kraft Foods. On February 11, 2021, Kraft sold the Planters and Corn Nuts brands to Hormel Foods. Corn Nuts are available in six flavors: Original, Ranch, BBQ (barbecue-flavored), Chile Picante con Limon, Nacho, and Jalapeño Cheddar.

Cornick 

A Filipino variant of corn nuts is cornick. Compared to the American variety, cornick pieces are typically smaller and crispier. Garlic is the most common flavor of cornick, with other common flavors including: chili cheese, adobo, barbecue, lechón manok (also known as roasted chicken), and sweet. Major brands include Boy Bawang (literally "Garlic Boy" in Tagalog, commonly sold in small packets), Corn Bits, and Safari.

A popular variety of cornick is the lighter, chicharrón-like chichacorn, a semi-popped style of cornick using glutinous corn from the Ilocos Region which is treated with lime before frying.

Diana 
Diana, a snack company in El Salvador, makes a variety of corn-nut-like snacks. These are called elotitos in Spanish, or cornbits. These come in a variety of seasonings, such as Lemon, Cheese and Chili, and Barbecue. These are sold throughout Central America.

In Spain 
In Spain they are a popular snack known as maíz tostado ("toasted corn"), maíz frito ("fried corn"), quicos ("Frankies") and pepes ("Joes"). 
The base flavor is very salty, though barbecue is also available.
Recently, crushed corn nuts are being introduced as a cover for battering.

See also 

 Puffed grain
 Corn snack
 Soy nut
 List of edible seeds
 List of maize dishes

References

External links

CornNuts
CornNuts at Planters.com
Diana snacks

Products introduced in 1936
Edible nuts and seeds
Snack foods